Theodore Meliteniotes (Constantinople, c. 1320 - 8 March 1393) was a Byzantine Greek astronomer, a sakellarios (treasurer) in the Byzantine bureaucracy, a supporter of Gregory Palamas and an opponent of the reunion with the Catholic Church. He became didaskalos ton didaskalon, i.e. the director of the Patriarchal School in 1360.

Works 
Theodore wrote an exegesis on the Gospels and a poem on Sôphrosynè (Temperance) which may be attributed to him.

Tribiblos 
Theodore's main work is his Astronomical Tribiblos, in three books, whose autograph manuscript is preserved (Vaticanus gr. 792), was composed before 1352. The work deals with an assortment of mathematical and astronomical issues and draws from some earlier Greek authors like George Pachymeres and Theodore Metochites. The second book is devoted to Ptolemy, whose calculations he explained in the manner of Theon of Alexandria. Finally, in book 3 he devotes himself to Persian astronomy, drawing especially from George Chrysokokkes, whose work he corrected in many places. In all of them, he explicitly condemns Astrology, dissociating his Astronomy from the Persian tradition represented by Chrysokokkes.

The pedagogical character of the Tribiblos is obvious and it  may have been used to give senior astronomy training to the Byzantine clergy.

References 
 "Meliteniotes, Theodore." Complete Dictionary of Scientific Biography. 2008. Encyclopedia.com. 11 September 2011.
Alberto Bardi, Persische Astronomie in Byzanz. Ein Beitrag zur Byzantinistik und zur Wissenschaftsgeschichte. Munich: Utzverlag, 2020.

External links 
 Evangelos Venetis, "Theodore Meliteniotes", Encyclopaedia of the Hellenic World, Asia Minor

1320 births
1393 deaths
Byzantine astronomers
Byzantine theologians
Byzantine writers
14th-century Byzantine writers
14th-century Byzantine scientists
14th-century Eastern Orthodox theologians
14th-century Greek astronomers